John Hopwood (1745 – June 2, 1802) was an American civil servant during the American Revolutionary War and founded the town of Hopwood, Pennsylvania (originally named "Woodstock") in western Pennsylvania.  John Hopwood was born in Virginia and married Hannah Bearcroft/Barecroft Humphreys, the young widow of Joseph Humphries, in 1770.

According to local and family lore, he was a neighbor and trusted friend of George Washington, who in recognition of his merit, selected him as an aide-de-camp and assigned him the responsibility of selecting winter quarters for the French Army. However, there is no supporting evidence of this beyond local histories compiled in the late 19th century; per the Daughters of the American Revolution, Hopwood was only recorded as having "furnished supplies" and having served as a juror.

Purported military service
According to a roll of Captain Alex Smith, Company of Colonel Rawlings’ Regiment commanded by Colonel J. Hall, a John Hopwood served under Captain Thomas Bell’s Company for a period of three years. The Maryland Revolutionary War Militia muster rolls also list a John Hopwood as being a member of the 6th Company Montgomery County, Maryland Militia in September 1777 and as being a member of the 6th Company, commanded by Captain Thomas Conner, on July 15, 1780; under the Command of Colonel Archibald Orme.

John Hopwood founded Hopwood, Pennsylvania when he left Stafford County, Virginia at the close of the War. It is alleged that when George Washington purchased  in Perryopolis, his friend John Hopwood also bought land, the land that became the Village of Hopwood at the foot of the Chestnut Ridge in Fayette County, Pennsylvania.<ref>USGS, Brownfield quadrangle Pennsylvania-Fayette County</ref>

Hopwood, Pennsylvania
Having purchased several large tracts of land in and around present-day Hopwood, John Hopwood recorded a town plan at the courthouse in nearby Uniontown, Pennsylvania on November 8, 1791, drawing up a rather unusual set of 400 level lots, each sectioned into a half an acre. He designed the village town with wide, straight roads and offered the new lots to settlers at a payment installation option which was then very uncommon.

New residents had 10 years to pay off the lots, with the stipulation that a dwelling had to be erected on the site within five years of purchase. Hopwood offered new residents all the free stone and timber they needed to construct their new homes. He dubbed the town "Woodstock." The "Charter of the Town of Woodstock" as written by Hopwood was printed by the noted Early American printer/publisher Nathaniel Willis (grandfather of Nathaniel Parker Willis) in Martinsburg, West Virginia (then Virginia).  The Charter is listed in many libraries' reference microfiche collections  (including The Library of Congress and The Library of Virginia) and in reference works (including Sabin's "Bibliotheca Americana" ), as an "Early American Imprint" and is also considered to be one of the earliest known works published in what is now the state of West Virginia.

The village was renamed "Monroe" in 1816 after President James Monroe stayed at the Moses Hopwood House. However, when it was discovered in 1881 that another town of Monroe already existed in the Commonwealth, it was renamed "Hopwood" after its founding father.

John Hopwood, a member of the Great Bethel Baptist Church, died June 2, 1802 in Hopwood, Pennsylvania. He was buried in Hopwood Cemetery (also known as the Founding Fathers Cemetery) where the following is inscribed upon his original tombstone

John Hopwood senior who departed this life June 2nd A.D. 1802, aged 57 years. He who can leave a cottage or a throne and alone with his spacious mind dwell.His replacement tombstone, raised in 1991 during the Hopwood bicentennial, also states: "Rev[olutionary War] Aide to George Washington - Village Founder".

Notes

References

Chapman Bros. Portrait and Biographical Album of Benton County, Iowa - Containing Full Page Portraits and Biographical Sketches of Prominent and Representative Citizens of the County. Chapman Bros., 1887.
Clements & Wright. Maryland Militia in the Revolutionary War. Heritage Books Inc., 2001.
Ellis, Franklin. History of Fayette County, Pennsylvania. Philadelphia: L.H. Everts and Co., 1882. Available Online from the University of Pittsburgh Digital Research Library. 
Federal Writers Project. Pennsylvania: A Guide to the Keystone State (American Guide Series). Scholarly Press, 1980.
Forbes, Marilyn. Pittsburgh Tribune-Review/TRIB:Live: Pearl of the Pike Tuesday, March 24, 2009. Tribune-Review Publishing Co., 2009. .
Gresham, John M. Biographical and Portrait Cyclopedia of Fayette County, Pennsylvania. General Books LLC, 2010.
Hadden, James. A History of Uniontown: The County Seat of Fayette County, Pennsylvania. New Werner Co., 1913.
Hopwood, John. Charter of the Town of Woodstock ... Martinsburg [W.Va.] Printed by N. Willis [1791]. available Online from the Library of Congress, "An American Time Capsule: Three Centuries of Broadsides and Other Printed Ephemera", http://hdl.loc.gov/loc.rbc/rbpe.18900300 (accessed 2000-2010)
Johnston, Elizabeth Bryant. Lineage Book - National Society of the Daughters of the American Revolution, Volume 2. NSDAR, 1892.
Nelson, S.B. Nelson's Biographical Dictionary: Fayette Co. - History of Pennsylvania. Kirtas Books, 1896.
Sabin et al. "Bibliotheca Americana: A Dictionary of Books relating to America, from its discovery to the present time" Vol. 29, 1936/1961
Shelley, Fred. Maryland Revolutionary War Militia List. Maryland Historical Society Library, 1955.
Smith & Swetnam. Guidebook To Historic Western Pennsylvania: Revised. University of Pittsburgh Press, 1991.
U.S. Geological Survey. Brownfield quadrangle Pennsylvania-Fayette County [map] Photorevised 1973.1:24,000. 7.5 Minute Series. Reston, VA: United States Department of the Interior, USGS.
Vivian, Cassandra. Images of America - The National Road in Pennsylvania. Arcadia Publishing, 2003.
Walkinshaw, Lewis Clark. Annals of southwestern Pennsylvania: Vol. 3''. Lewis Historical Publishing Company, Inc., 1939.

External links

Library of Congress Microfiche Listing for "Charter of the Town of Woodstock"
Internet Archive Library copy of "Bibliotheca Americana"(Volume 29)

1745 births
1802 deaths
People from Stafford County, Virginia
American people of Scotch-Irish descent
Virginia militiamen in the American Revolution
Maryland militiamen in the American Revolution
Virginia colonial people